Axel Murswieck is a German political scientist, commentator, and associate professor of political science at the Faculty of Economic and Social Sciences of the University of Heidelberg.

Education 
Murswieck studied political science, history and English studies at the Free University of Berlin. Diploma in political science in 1969. In 1973 he obtained a Ph.D. in social science from the University of Bielefeld.

Career 
From 1969 to 1973 Murswieck worked as a research associate and lecturer at the University of Munich (LMU), before joining the University of Heidelberg as assistant professor of political science in 1973. Research fellowships included those at Cornell University in Ithaca (US), Washington, D.C., and at the Institut d'Études Politiques in Grenoble (France). Axel Murswieck taught at the Institut d'Études Politiques in Paris, at the Universidad Autónoma in Barcelona and at the Institute of Administrative Sciences (Deutschen Hochschule für Verwaltungswissenschaften) in Speyer, Germany. Since 1989 he has been associate professor of political science at the University of Heidelberg. Between 1991 and 2000 he headed the Research Committee "Political system and governance of the Federal Republic of Germany" of the German Political Science Association (DVPW).

Books/edited volumes (selection) 
 Regierungsform durch Planungsorganisation: Eine empirische Untersuchung im Bereich der Bundesregierung, Opladen 1975
 Die staatliche Kontrolle der Arzneimittelsicherheit in der Bundesrepublik und den USA, Opladen 1983
 Sozialpolitik in den USA. Eine Einführung Opladen: Westdeutscher Verlag, 1988
 (ed.) Regieren und Politikberatung, Opladen 1994
 editor with Hans-Ulrich Derlien. Der Politikzyklus zwischen Bonn und Brüssel, Opladen 1999
 editor with Hans-Ulrich Derlien. Regieren nach Wahlen, Opladen 2001

Articles 
 Public Policies in Disarray: Political Restraints in Policy-Making, in: International Social Science Journal, Vol. 108 (1986).
 Advising the Government – A Comparative View on France and West Germany, in: International Social Science Journal, 1989.
 Policy Advice and Decisionmaking in the German Federal Bureaucracy, in: Guy Peters/ Anthony Barker (eds.): Advising West German Governments: Inquiries, Expertise and Public Policy. Edinburgh, 1993.
 A New World of Welfare? Amerika nach der Sozialhilfereform, in: Soziale Sicherheit 5/2002.

References

Year of birth missing (living people)
Living people
German political scientists
Bielefeld University alumni
Academic staff of Heidelberg University